St. Anne's-Belfield School is a co-educational, independent boarding and day school for pre-kindergarten through 12th grade.

History
The goal of its founders was to provide for their daughters the academic opportunities offered to their sons by the University of Virginia. In 1910 the Reverend Henry B. Lee, Rector of Christ Episcopal Church, persuaded his vestry to purchase the institute. Reopened as St. Anne's School, it became part of the Episcopal diocese system and continued at its downtown location until 1939, when it was moved to the present upper and middle school campus. In 1985, the school became independent of the diocese.

Like St. Anne's, the coeducational elementary school's origins were downtown, where in 1911 Miss Nancy Gordon opened a primary school known first as Miss Nancy's and then as Stonefield. After her death, it was merged with University Country Day School (the Bellair School) and renamed The Belfield School in 1957.

In 1975, after a five-year trial period, St. Anne's and Belfield officially merged. The school has an honor system ( “A student is not to lie, cheat or steal.”) and weekly chapel services.

Famous alumnae include: Fendi models and Orange County oil executives.

Accreditation and affiliations
Accreditation:
The Virginia Association of Independent Schools

Affiliations:
The Association of Boarding Schools
The Council for Advancement and Support of Education
The Educational Records Bureau
The National Association of College Admission Counselors
The National Association of Independent Schools
The Secondary School Admission Test Board

Campus
St. Anne's-Belfield School is a college preparatory school located on two campuses totaling  of land. The Greenway Rise Campus, located on Ivy Road, is home to the Upper School (grades 9th to 12th), as well as the Administrative, Arts, and Alumni/Development buildings. These buildings, located on the Upper School campus, include the James F. Scott Center For Arts & Science, Randolph Hall & Annex and the Lee-DuVal Hall. The Belfield Campus is home to the Lower School (pre-kindergarten to fourth grade), Middle School (grades 5th to 8th), the Conway Convocation Center, the Tarring Gym, and the athletic fields.  St. Anne's-Belfield has six buildings housing its 97 classrooms (including three computer labs and eight science labs), two libraries, and three gymnasiums on two campuses which total . Recent additions include a  Learning Village, a squash court complex, and a state-of-the-art turf athletic field.

Notable alumni 

 Javin DeLaurier (born 1998) - basketball player in the Israeli Basketball Premier League
 Schuyler Fisk – singer, songwriter, and actress; daughter of actress Sissy Spacek
 Nat Friedman - technology executive; CEO of GitHub
 Chris Long – Retired Football player for the Philadelphia Eagles and podcast host
 Kyle Long – Football player for the Kansas City Chiefs
 Tessa Majors  student at Barnard College and victim of a widely-publicized murder
 Tom Perriello – Former U.S. Representative for Virginia's 5th congressional district
 Anne-Marie Slaughter – scholar, lawyer, government official
 Matthew Swift – entrepreneur; Co-founder, Chairman and CEO of the nonprofit Concordia Summit
 Aaron Stinnie — Football player for the Tampa Bay Buccaneers

Notes

External links
 St. Anne's-Belfield School

Private high schools in Virginia
Preparatory schools in Virginia
Boarding schools in Virginia
Schools in Charlottesville, Virginia
Educational institutions established in 1910
Private middle schools in Virginia
Private elementary schools in Virginia
1910 establishments in Virginia